Omega Gamma Delta is an American high school fraternity, now recast with a focus on alumni clubs. It was founded June 22, 1902 by Percy & Arthur Edrop and Walter Dohm in Brooklyn, New York.

Omega Gamma Delta presently has over 100 chapters.

External links 
 Home Page

Fraternities and sororities in the United States
Student organizations established in 1902
1902 establishments in New York City